The men's team pursuit competition of the cycling events at the 2015 Pan American Games was held on July 18 at the Milton Velodrome in Milton, Ontario.

Schedule
All times are Eastern Standard Time (UTC-3).

Results
8 teams of four competitors competed. The top two teams will race for gold, while third and fourth race for the bronze medals.

Qualification

First Round

Finals

References

Track cycling at the 2015 Pan American Games
Men's team pursuit (track cycling)